Mondor is a surname. It may refer to:

 Ben Mondor (1925-2010), American baseball team owner
 Card Mondor (1922-2001), Australian magician and stage performer
 Colleen Mondor, an editor of Eclectica Magazine
 Émilie Mondor (1981-2006), Canadian Olympic athlete
 Henri Mondor (1885-1962), French physician and historian
 Pierre Mondor, a character in Too Many Cooks, a Nero Wolfe novel by American author Rex Stout